Canada toured Kenya from 18 to 20 October. Kenya won both of their ODI matches and the Intercontinental Cup match.

Intercontinental Cup match

ODI series

1st ODI

2nd ODI

International cricket tours of Kenya
Canadian cricket tours abroad
2007 in Kenyan cricket
2007 in Canadian cricket